The 12th Assembly District of Wisconsin is one of 99 districts in the Wisconsin State Assembly.  Located in southeast Wisconsin, the district is entirely contained within northwest Milwaukee County.  It comprises much of the north side of the city of Milwaukee, as well as part of northern Wauwatosa.  The district is represented by Democrat LaKeshia Myers, since January 2019.

The 12th Assembly district is located within Wisconsin's 4th Senate district, along with the 10th and 11th Assembly districts.

History
The district was created in the 1972 redistricting act (1971 Wisc. Act 304) which first established the numbered district system, replacing the previous system which allocated districts to specific counties.  The 12th district was drawn with novel boundaries in south and east Washington County, along with part of south Ozaukee County.  In the prior legislative district scheme, Washington County and Ozaukee County were each single-district counties.  The last representative of the Washington County district, Frederick C. Schroeder, went on to win election to become the first representative of the 12th Assembly district.

The 1982 court-ordered redistricting plan moved the 12th district into central Milwaukee County.  The district has remained in Milwaukee County since then, though the boundaries shifted east in the 1983 legislative redistricting, and then north and west in 1992, 2002, and 2011, with the district now covering the northwest corner of the county.

List of past representatives

References 

Wisconsin State Assembly districts
Milwaukee County, Wisconsin